Canonbury railway station serves the districts of Canonbury and Highbury within the London Borough of Islington in north London. It is on London Overground's North London line and East London line. The station and all trains serving it are operated by London Overground, and the station is in Travelcard Zone 2. This location of the station is close to the boundary with the London Borough of Hackney.

History

The station was originally named "Newington Road and Balls Pond Road" when opened in 1858 by the North London Railway, and was sited east of the present station on the east side of Newington Green Road. The station was renamed "Canonbury" in July 1870 and then resited to its present location, the west side of Douglas Road (now Wallace Road), in December of the same year. The Victorian main building was demolished in 1969, although the building was fully intact.

In 2007, the ticket office was extensively refurbished, as part of the station upgrade programme delivered through conversion to London Overground. On 1 June 2010, as a result of the East London Line extension, North London line services were rerouted to the newly constructed platforms 3 and 4, with the East London line trains now using refurbished platforms 1 and 2.

A passenger service operated to/from Broad Street from 1875 until 1976 when suburban services from the main line were diverted to Moorgate via the newly built surface connection between Finsbury Park and Drayton Park.

Between 14 May 1979 and 11 May 1985 the station was served by the Crosstown Linkline diesel multiple unit service between Camden Road and North Woolwich. 

After reopening on 1 June 2010, the work continued until May 2011 with a reduced service operating Mondays to Saturdays and no service at all on Sundays.

During the NLL closure of February–May 2010, the through route was moved to the north side of the cutting, and two adjacent brand new platforms provided, an island platform replacing the former eastbound platform. This allowed the extended ELL to serve Canonbury (and Highbury & Islington) on a pair of completely segregated tracks occupying the former route on the south side of the cutting.

Since the northern extension of the East London Line, which was completed and opened in March 2011, Canonbury station has had four platforms, giving interchange between the London Overground East London line (ELL) and North London line (NLL) with step-free access to all platforms and peak service frequencies of 12 trains per hour in each direction.

Services

All times below are correct as of the May 2011 timetables.

North London Line

Mondays to Fridays there is a service approximately every 7–8 minutes throughout the morning and evening peaks, changing to roughly every 10 minutes off-peak. On Saturdays the service is approximately every 10 minutes. Services have resumed on Sundays and are similar to those on Saturdays. Details of these services are below:
The times below are the typical weekday service at the station in trains per hour:
 4 westbound to  via Camden Road and Willesden Junction.
 2 westbound to Clapham Junction also via Camden Road and Willesden Junction (no late evening service)
 6 eastbound to  via Hackney.

East London Line
Mondays to Saturdays there is a service every 6–9 minutes throughout the day, while on Sundays before 13:00 there is a service every 15 minutes, changing to every 7–8 minutes until the end of service after that. Details of these services are below:

The times below are the typical weekday service at the station in trains per hour:

 4 southbound to  via Surrey Quays and Sydenham.
 4 southbound to  via Surrey Quays &  (not Sundays).

Direct services to/from  run on Sundays only (change at Dalston Junction at other times)

Services run through the night on Friday and Saturday.

Connections
London Buses route 236 serves the station.

References

External links

 Excel file displaying National Rail station usage information for 2005/06 

Railway stations in the London Borough of Islington
Former North London Railway stations
Railway stations in Great Britain opened in 1858
Railway stations in Great Britain closed in 1870
Railway stations in Great Britain opened in 1870
Railway stations served by London Overground
1870 establishments in England